Orchis purpurea, the lady orchid, is a herbaceous plant belonging to the genus Orchis of the family Orchidaceae.

Description 

Orchis purpurea reaches on average  of height. The leaves are broad and oblong-lanceolate, forming a rosette about the base of the plant and surrounding the flower spike. They are fleshy and bright green, and can be up to 15 cm long. The inflorescence is densely covered with up to 50 flowers. The sepals and upper petals are violaceous or purple (hence the Latin name purpurea of the species). The flower's labellum is pale pink or white, with a center spotted by clusters of violaceous or purple hairs. It is divided into three lobes; the outer two are small and narrow, and the inner is large, rounded, and heart-shaped. Flowering occurs in late April to June.

Range and habitat 
This orchid can be found in most parts of Europe, northern Africa, Turkey and the Caucasus. It usually grows in sloping woodlands, particularly in mixed deciduous / oak forests, but occasionally occur in meadows.

Identification 
Orchis purpurea may be mistaken for the military orchid (Orchis militaris) or monkey orchid (Orchis simia). The three species often hybridize, making them difficult to identify, although the shape of the labellum is distinct to each species.

Threats 
Deer, especially the muntjac, and slugs are among the greatest threats to this orchid. Human activity - woodland clearance, picking flowers or uprooting plants - is a major concern.

References 

 Leroy-Terquem, Gerald and Jean Parisot. Orchids: Care and Cultivation. London: Cassel Publishers Ltd., 1991.
 Schoser, Gustav. Orchid Growing Basics. New York: Sterling Publishing Co., Inc., 1993.
 White, Judy. Taylor’s Guide to Orchids. Frances Tenenbaum, Series Editor. New York: Houghton-Mifflin, 1996.
 Alec Pridgeon. The Illustrated Encyclopedia of Orchids.  Published by the Timber Press.
 Bechtel, Cribb and Launert. The Manual Of Cultivated Orchid Species. Published by The MIT Press.

External links 
 
 
 Britain's Orchids
 British Wild Flowers Gallery
 Tiscali Reference: Wildlife
 Orchids of Britain and Europe

purpurea
Orchids of Europe
Flora of North Africa
Flora of Turkey
Plants described in 1762
Taxa named by William Hudson (botanist)